Kyoomba is a rural locality in the Southern Downs Region, Queensland, Australia.

Geography 
Eukey Road forms the western boundary of the locality. Quart Pot Creek flows from the Storm King Dam in Storm King to the south through to the north of the locality and then forms the north-west boundary. Apart from some undeveloped hills in the locality, the land is predominantly used for cattle grazing.

History 
The locality was named and bounded on 15 December 2000.

References 

Southern Downs Region
Localities in Queensland